The 2019 Penn State Nittany Lions football team represented Pennsylvania State University in the 2019 NCAA Division I FBS football season. The team was led by sixth-year head coach James Franklin and played its home games in Beaver Stadium in University Park, Pennsylvania. They competed as a member of the Big Ten East Division of the Big Ten Conference.

Previous season
In 2018, the Nittany Lions finished with a 9–4 overall record and finished third in the Big Ten East Division, with a 6–3 conference record. They finished ranked seventeenth nationally in the AP Poll and Coaches Poll after a 27–24 loss to Kentucky in the Citrus Bowl.

Offseason

Staff changes
On January 2, 2019, James Franklin announced that wide receivers coach David Corley was relieved of his duties.  This came just one day after Penn State's 27–24 loss to Kentucky in the Citrus Bowl.  On January 10, former Duke assistant coach Gerad Parker was announced as the team's new wide receivers coach.  On February 15, 2019, it was announced that special teams coordinator and assistant defensive line coach Phil Galiano would be leaving Penn State to become an assistant special teams coach with the New Orleans Saints.  On February 21, 2019, Penn State hired Joe Lorig, from Texas Tech, as special teams coordinator and defensive assistant.

Recruiting
The Nittany Lions signed 19 recruits on early signing day in December 2018. Four recruits signed with Penn State on February 6, 2019, pushing their total commitments to 23.

2019 NFL Draft

Transfers

The Nittany Lions added 2 players and lost 12 players due to transfer.

Returning starters

Offense (9)

Defense (11)

Special teams (2)

Preseason Big Ten poll
Although the Big Ten Conference has not held an official preseason poll since 2010, Cleveland.com has polled sports journalists representing all member schools as a de facto preseason media poll since 2011. For the 2019 poll, Penn State was projected to finish in fourth in the East Division.

Schedule

Spring game

Regular season
The team hosted three non-conference games against the Idaho Vandals (first ever meeting) from the Big Sky Conference, Buffalo Bulls from the Mid-American Conference (MAC) and the Pittsburgh Panthers from the Atlantic Coast Conference (ACC).

During the 2019 Nittany Lions season, Penn State went against Big Ten conference opponents Maryland, Purdue, Iowa, Michigan, Michigan State, Minnesota, Indiana, Ohio State and Rutgers. The 2019 schedule consisted of 7 home games and 5 away. 

Schedule Source:

Game summaries

Idaho

Buffalo

Pittsburgh

at Maryland

Purdue

at No. 17 Iowa

No. 16 Michigan

at Michigan State

at No. 13AP/17CFP Minnesota

No. 24AP Indiana

at No. 2AP/CFP Ohio State

Rutgers

vs. No. 15AP/17CFP Memphis (Cotton Bowl)

Rankings

Personnel

Coaching staff

Roster

Source:

Players drafted into the NFL

References

Penn State
Penn State Nittany Lions football seasons
Lambert-Meadowlands Trophy seasons
Cotton Bowl Classic champion seasons
Penn State Nittany Lions football